Judith Hoag (born June 29, 1963) is an American actress. She is best known for playing April O'Neil in Teenage Mutant Ninja Turtles (1990) and Gwen Cromwell Piper in the Disney Channel television film series Halloweentown, from 1998 to 2006.

Hoag is also known for her recurring roles as Cindy Dutton Price in the HBO drama series Big Love (2006–2011), Tandy Hampton in the ABC musical drama series Nashville (2012–2018), and Stephanie Quinn in the Syfy fantasy drama series The Magicians (2016–2020).

Early life
Hoag was born in Newburyport, Massachusetts. As a teen, Hoag attended Walnut Hill School in Natick, Massachusetts where she concentrated on acting. She graduated in 1981.

Career
Hoag has acted professionally since 1986. That year, she got one of her first roles as a series regular in the ABC daytime soap opera Loving in the role of Charlotte 'Lotty' Bates Alden. After leaving Loving in 1988, Hoag began her career in primetime television, and in next year won female lead role on CBS comedy series Wolf.  The series was canceled after a single season. In 1990 she starred in films A Matter of Degrees and Cadillac Man.

Hoag is most well known for her role as April O'Neil in the first Teenage Mutant Ninja Turtles film. The film turned out to be a huge success at the box office, eventually making over $135 million in North America, and over $66 million outside North America, for a worldwide total of over $200 million, making it the ninth highest-grossing film of 1990 worldwide. After Teenage Mutant Ninja Turtles fame, Hoag starred in a number of pilots not picked up as a series, and appeared in several television films, including Fine Things by Danielle Steel, and Switched at Birth opposite Bonnie Bedelia.

Hoag received further recognition as Gwen Cromwell Piper in the Disney Channel Halloweentown franchise, appearing in Halloweentown (1998),  Halloweentown II: Kalabar's Revenge (2001), Halloweentown High (2004) and Return to Halloweentown (2006). In a 2020 Galaxy Con question-and-answer panel, Hoag revealed she had a meeting with the head of Walt Disney Television where she read for the part and got cast in the role after it was revealed that the head's son was a die-hard Ninja Turtle fan as Hoag had previously played April O'Neil in 1990's Teenage Mutant Ninja Turtles.

She also appeared in the films Armageddon (1998), Flying By (2009), I Am Number Four (2011) and Hitchcock (2012), and has made over 60 guest appearances on television shows, including Quantum Leap, Melrose Place, Roseanne, The Nanny, Murder, She Wrote, The X-Files,  Six Feet Under, Ghost Whisperer, NYPD Blue, Grey's Anatomy, Private Practice, CSI: NY, Criminal Minds, Sons of Anarchy, Castle, The Middle, Grimm and among other notable television series. 

From 2006 to 2011, Hoag also appeared as Cindy Price on the HBO drama series Big Love.

In 2012, Hoag was cast in a recurring role in the ABC drama series Nashville created by Academy Award winner Callie Khouri. She plays the poised and driven Tandy Hampton, daughter and protégé of Lamar Wyatt. She referees sister Rayna (Connie Britton) and Lamar's (Powers Boothe) contentious relationship, trying to calm the waters. She appeared total in 40 episodes, include almost every episode during the first two seasons. 

In 2015, Hoag filmed a cameo for the 2016 film Teenage Mutant Ninja Turtles: Out of the Shadows, but the scene with her was cut from the final film. Her scene later appeared in the film's home media release.

From 2016 to 2020, Hoag appeared in a recurring role as Olivia Taylor Dudley's character mother in the Syfy fantasy series The Magicians, and played supporting role in the 2018 romantic drama film Forever My Girl.

Personal life
In 1988, she married actor Vince Grant. They have two children, a son and a daughter. The couple divorced in 2016. On February 13, 2021, she married Phillip Stone.

Filmography

Film

Television

References

External links
 
 

1963 births
20th-century American actresses
21st-century American actresses
American acting coaches
Actresses from Massachusetts
American film actresses
American soap opera actresses
American television actresses
Living people
People from Newburyport, Massachusetts